Maxime Jasse (born 4 January 1988) is a French professional footballer who plays as midfielder for Mâcon.

Career
Jasse trained as a youth with AJ Auxerre, and in August 2007 made his Ligue 1 debut for the club against Lyon. He spent the 2009–10 season on loan with Ligue 2 side Dijon, and experienced a single first team game during the spell. In July 2011 he left Auxerre and signed for FC Villefranche of Championnat de France Amateur.

Jasse has been captain of Villefranche since at least 2015.

On 17 June 2021, he moved to Mâcon.

References

External links
 
 

1988 births
Living people
Sportspeople from Villefranche-sur-Saône
Association football midfielders
French footballers
AJ Auxerre players
Dijon FCO players
FC Villefranche Beaujolais players
UF Mâconnais players
Ligue 1 players
Ligue 2 players
Championnat National players
Championnat National 2 players
Footballers from Auvergne-Rhône-Alpes